Herencia is a municipality in the Province of Ciudad Real, Castilla-La Mancha, Spain.

Herencia may also refer to:

 Herencia (album), a 2006 album by Soraya
 Herencia (film) (Inheritance), a 2001 Argentine film

See also
 La herencia (disambiguation)